Freigeweht is an album by German keyboardist and composer Rainer Brüninghaus recorded in 1980 and released on the ECM label.

Reception
The Allmusic review by Michael G. Nastos awarded the album 3 stars calling it "Airy, minimalist compositions".

Track listing
All compositions by Rainer Brüninghaus
 "Stufen" - 8:24 
 "Spielraum" - 6:03 
 "Radspuren" - 10:52 
 "Die Flüsse Hinauf" - 8:37 
 "Täuschung der Luft" - 4:20 
 "Freigeweht" - 12:16
Recorded at Talent Studio in Oslo, Norway in August 1980

Personnel
Rainer Brüninghaus - piano, synthesizer
Kenny Wheeler - flugelhorn
Brynjar Hoff - oboe, English horn
Jon Christensen - drums

References

ECM Records albums
1981 albums
Albums produced by Manfred Eicher